DD3 may refer to:

DD3, a postcode district in the DD postcode area
Destruction Derby Raw
Double Dragon 3: The Rosetta Stone
Development Driller III
 Aldo-keto reductase family 1, member A1, enzyme